Route 377 is a  road on the island of Maui in Hawaii. The route starts and ends at Route 37, and is signed as Haleakala Highway for the northernmost , and Kekaulike Avenue for the rest, because the Haleakala highway continues on Hawaii Route 378.

Major intersections

See also

 List of state highways in Hawaii

References

External links

 0377
Transportation in Maui County, Hawaii